The FT Global 500 is an annual snapshot of the world's largest companies to show how corporate fortunes have changed in the past year, highlighting relative performance of countries and sectors. The companies are ranked by market capitalization. The greater the stock market value of a company, the higher its ranking. Market cap is the share price multiplied by the number of shares issued.

For each company the main Global 500 table shows the rank in that year and the year before, the country, market capitalization, sector, turnover, net income, total assets and employees. The price, price earnings ratio, dividend yield and the company's year-end are included in the Global 500 on FT.com.

See also 
 Fortune Global 500
 40 under 40 (Fortune magazine)
 Fortune 1000
 Forbes Global 2000 
 Bentley Infrastructure 500
 List of largest companies by revenue
 List of corporations by market capitalization

References

External links 
 FT.com: current Financial Times Global 500 listings

Global 500
Lists of companies by revenue
Corporation-related lists
International rankings
Top lists